Mattias Hävelid (born January 1, 2004) is a Swedish ice hockey defenceman playing for Linköping HC of the Swedish Hockey League (SHL). Hävelid was selected 45th overall, in the second round of the 2022 NHL Entry Draft, by the San Jose Sharks. Mattias is the son of former ice hockey player Niclas Hävelid.

Career statistics

Regular season and playoffs

International

References

External links

2004 births
Living people
Linköping HC players
People from Täby Municipality
San Jose Sharks draft picks
Swedish ice hockey defencemen